Parorectis is a genus of tortoise beetles in the family Chrysomelidae. There are at least three described species in Parorectis.

Species
These three species belong to the genus Parorectis:
 Parorectis callosa (Boheman, 1854)
 Parorectis rugosa (Boheman, 1854)
 Parorectis sublaevis (Barber, 1946)

References

Further reading

 
 
 
 

Cassidinae